Charles Trevelyan may refer to:

 Sir Charles Trevelyan, 1st Baronet (1807–1886), civil servant and Governor of Madras
 Sir Charles Trevelyan, 3rd Baronet (1870–1958), Member of Parliament, grandson of Charles Edward Trevelyan